"Committee 2008: A Free Choice" (Komitet 2008: Svobodnyy vybor) was an umbrella organization of the Russian democratic opposition, launched on 29 January 2004 and broke up in the spring of 2005.

History 
It was formed in response to the failure of Yabloko and the Union of Right Forces to gain any seats in the 2003 elections to the State Duma, and to the growing authoritarianism of President Vladimir Putin who was re-elected in March 2004 with over 70% of the votes cast.

The Committee's goal was to ensure free and fair presidential elections in 2008. Putin was due to step down as President, after serving two terms, and the Committee intended to work against the election of the Kremlin's chosen successor, whoever that might be. The chairman of the 2008 Committee was Garry Kasparov; the original signatories of the 2004 declaration were Mikhail Berger, Vladimir Bukovsky, Alexander Golts, Igor Irtenyev, Vladimir Kara-Murza Jr., Yevgeny Kiselyov, Yulia Latynina, Dmitry Muratov, Boris Nemtsov, Sergey Parkhomenko, Alexander Ryklin, Victor Shenderovich and Irina Yasina. Others who joined later were politicians Vladimir Ryzhkov and Irina Khakamada.

The Committee was short-lived, holding its last meeting in summer 2005. A number of its members subsequently helped to set up the United Civil Front and the much broader Other Russia coalition (2006-2010) which were actively engaged in protest activities in 2007 and 2008.

References

External links
 The Other Russia - Official site
  Другая Россия - Official site
  Сайт «Марш несогласных» - March of the Discontented
  Итоговое заявление участников конференции «Другая Россия» Concluding statement by the participants, www.kasparov.ru

Defunct political party alliances in Russia
Liberalism in Russia
Political parties established in 2004
2008 Russian presidential election